William Reed Scott (6 December 1907 – 12 January 1969) was an English professional footballer, who played as an inside forward. He is best remembered for his time with Brentford, for whom he made over 290 appearances. He was posthumously inducted into the Brentford Hall of Fame in 2015. Scott was capped once by England at international level.

Career

Middlesbrough 
Born in Willington Quay, Scott began his senior career at First Division club Middlesbrough in 1927. He made just 28 appearances in five years at Ayresome Park and departed at the end of the 1931–32 season.

Brentford 
Scott signed for Third Division South club Brentford in May 1932 and was joined by former Middlesbrough teammates Jack Holliday and Bert Watson at Griffin Park. Scott quickly made an impression, making 42 appearances and scoring 15 goals in the 1932–33 season, to help the Bees to the Third Division South title. Now playing in the Second Division, further success would follow in the 1934–35 season, when Scott's 18 goals helped Brentford to their second title in three seasons, to secure a place in the First Division for the first time in the club's history. Scott's 18-goal tally also included five goals in an 8–1 win over Barnsley on 15 December 1934, which made him the second Brentford player to achieve the feat after Jack Holliday the previous year.

Scott performed strongly in the First Division and was a virtual ever-present during the 1935–36 and 1936–37 seasons, scoring 11 and 15 goals respectively and in total, he missed just five games in his first five seasons at Griffin Park. Scott played on into the early part of the 1939–40 season, when professional football was suspended due to the break-out of the Second World War. After guesting for Newcastle United, Hartlepools United and Darlington during the war, Scott returned to Brentford after hostilities ended in 1945. By now in his late 30s, Scott made his final appearance for the Bees in a 4–1 FA Cup fourth round replay defeat to Leicester City on 3 February 1947. Scott made 295 appearances and scored 87 goals during his time with Brentford.

Aldershot 
Scott joined Third Division South club Aldershot in 1947 and made 21 appearances before retiring from league football in 1948.

Dover 
Scott ended his career with a short spell at Kent League club Dover, under player-manager and former Brentford teammate George Poyser.

International career 
Scott was called up as a reserve for an England v Anglo-Scots match at Highbury in May 1935. Scott's form for Brentford during the 1936–37 season saw him called up to the England squad for a Home International away to Wales on 17 October 1936 and he played in the 2–1 defeat.

Career statistics

Honours 
Brentford
Football League Second Division: 1934–35
Football League Third Division South: 1932–33

Individual

 Brentford Hall of Fame

References

1907 births
1969 deaths
English footballers
England international footballers
Brentford F.C. players
English Football League players
People from Willington Quay
Footballers from Tyne and Wear
Association football inside forwards
Middlesbrough F.C. players
Aldershot F.C. players
Hartlepool United F.C. wartime guest players
Darlington F.C. wartime guest players
Dover F.C. players
Newcastle United F.C. wartime guest players
Kent Football League (1894–1959) players